The Kernow national football team represents Cornwall at international association football since 2018. It uses the native Cornish name of the region, Kernow, to represent its team, and is managed by the Kernow Football Alliance. As the side is not a member of UEFA or FIFA, it cannot qualify for the UEFA European Championship or FIFA World Cup, although it is a member of ConIFA and is eligible to participate in the ConIFA World Football Cup and ConIFA European Football Cup. The team is currently co-managed by Phil Lafferty and Darren Gilbert, and coached by Darren Wright and Andrew Graham.

History
Following the 2018 ConIFA World Football Cup held in London, the Kernow Football Alliance was formed by Andrew Bragg and Jason Heaton, and officially joined CONIFA in November 2018. They played their first game on 25 February 2019 against Foxhole Stars in an unofficial game, running out 3–2 winners. The next month, it was announced that they would take part in the 2019 Atlantic Heritage Cup, which was to act as a 2020 ConIFA World Football Cup qualification tournament. However, they withdrew before the tournament, to be replaced by Chagos Islands. They played their first official international on 25 May 2019 against Barawa, winning 5–0 in Bodmin.Kernow have beaten  Devon twice in a cup match .They beat Shropshire,Devon and Nottingham in a competition called the 4 teams (you can only get in the 4 teams by winning the county cup.)

Recent fixtures and results

Selected International Opponents

Players

Current squad
The following players were called up to a friendly against  on 25 August 2019.

Caps and goals correct as of 25 August 2019 after the game against . CONIFA includes unofficial friendlies towards the caps total.

Recent call-ups
The following players have been called up in the past twelve months or withdrew from the squad due to injury or suspension.

References

External links
Kernow Football Alliance on Twitter

Football in Cornwall
CONIFA member associations
European national and official selection-teams not affiliated to FIFA
Football teams in England